Chemical Markup Language (ChemML or CML) is an approach to managing molecular information using tools such as XML and Java. It was the first domain specific implementation based strictly on XML, first based on a DTD and later on an XML Schema, the most robust and widely used system for precise information management in many areas. It has been developed over more than a decade by Murray-Rust, Rzepa and others and has been tested in many areas and on a variety of machines.

Chemical information is traditionally stored in many different file types which inhibit reuse of the documents. CML uses XML's portability to help CML developers and chemists design interoperable documents. There are a number of tools that can generate, process and view CML documents. Publishers can distribute chemistry within XML documents by using CML, e.g. in RSS documents.

CML is capable of supporting a wide range of chemical concepts including:
 molecules
 reactions
 spectra and analytical data
 computational chemistry
 chemical crystallography and materials

Details of CML and points currently under discussion are now posted on the CML Blog.

Versioning 
Versions of the schema are available at SourceForge. As of April 2012, the latest frozen schema is CML v2.4. Some constructs in CML v1 are now deprecated.

Tools 
JUMBO began life as the Java Universal Molecular Browser for Objects but is now a Java library that supports validation, reading and writing of CML as well as conversion of several legacy formats to CML and, for example, a reaction in CML to an animated SVG representation of the reaction. JUMBO has evolved into an extensive Java library, CMLDOM, supporting all elements in the schema. Although JUMBO used to be a browser, the preferred approach is to use the Open Source tools Jmol and JChemPaint, some of which use alternative CML libraries. See Blue Obelisk.

See also
List of document markup languages
Comparison of document markup languages
 Software importing and exporting a valid CML format
Bioclipse
CDK
JOELib
OpenBabel
Avogadro
Joint Committee on Atomic and Molecular Physical Data (another well-known standard, especially for spectroscopic data)
Blue Obelisk community for Open Source chemical software
MathML
PCML -- an unofficial successor used in DeepMatter's DigitalGlassware platform

References

Further reading

External links 
Chemical Markup Language (CML) This includes the CML Schema, links to tools, documentation, and source code
Discussion list
CML Blog
The original (old) site
The Jmol Browser's site

Markup languages
Industry-specific XML-based standards
Chemical file formats
Computer-related introductions in 1999